Saint-Jean—Iberville—Napierville was a federal electoral district in the province of Quebec, Canada, that was represented in the House of Commons of Canada from 1949 to 1968.

This riding was created in 1947 from parts of Beauharnois—Laprairie and St. Johns—Iberville—Napierville ridings. It consisted of: 
 the city of St. Jean and the county of St. John (except the municipalities of Notre-Dame-du-Mont-Carmel, St. Bernard-de-Lacolle and the village of Lacolle);
 the county of Iberville and the town of Iberville;
 the county of Napierville;
 that part of the county of Laprairie included in the municipality of St-Jacques-le-Mineur.

It was abolished in 1966 when it was redistributed into Missisquoi and Saint-Jean ridings.

Members of Parliament

This riding elected the following Members of Parliament:

Election results

See also 

 List of Canadian federal electoral districts
 Past Canadian electoral districts

External links 
Riding history from the Library of Parliament

Former federal electoral districts of Quebec